Laage (Meckl) station is a railway station in the municipality of Laage, located in the Rostock district in Mecklenburg-Vorpommern, Germany.

The station was opened in 1886 as simply Laage station, and adopted its current name in the early-1930s. There is also a branch line to the air base where Jagdgeschwader 73 is based, which was renovated in 2021.

Notable places nearby
Rostock–Laage Airport (approx. 1 km away)

References

TrainStation
Railway stations in Mecklenburg-Western Pomerania
Buildings and structures in Rostock (district)
Rostock S-Bahn stations